Loudonville is a hamlet in the town of Colonie, in Albany County, New York, United States. Loudonville was a census-designated place in the 1970, 1980, and 1990 US Census, but ceased to be in the 2000 Census, but became a CDP again in 2020.

History

The hamlet is named after John Campbell, 4th Earl of Loudoun and was originally a 19th-century summer resort for some of Albany's wealthiest residents. Loudon Road, known as Old Plank Road in the early 19th century, is lined with several historic Jeffersonian mansions. Loudonville started as a hamlet on Loudon Road (originally a plank road), at the intersection of Crumitie Road. Ireland's Corners was a separate hamlet to the north at the intersection of Loudon Road and Menand/Osborne Road, with a post office. Ireland's Corners is named for Elias H. Ireland who in 1832 bought the heavily wooded area from the Patroon, Stephen Van Rensselaer. In 1871 the post office at Ireland's Corners was renamed Loudonville.

Geography
The community is located directly north of Albany and south of Newtonville. The hamlet is centered on the original Ireland's Corners, the intersection of U.S. Route 9 with Osborne Road (County Route 154)/Menand Road (NY Route 378) (west bound name/east bound names respectively), with the northwestern corner bisected by Old Niskayuna Road (County Route 152). Though as a hamlet, it has poorly defined borders, the census designated place of Loudonville had  concrete borders.

Location

Landmarks
Siena College: A private Roman Catholic College (Franciscan)
Schuyler Meadows Club: The Club was founded in 1926 by residents of Loudonville who did not wish to travel to the Albany Country Club, which at the time was located at the current site of the uptown campus of the University at Albany, SUNY. The clubhouse, built in 1927, is modeled on the central portion of George Washington's Mount Vernon home.
The Bryan's Store, D. D. T. Moore Farmhouse, Gorham House, Hughson Mansion, Loudon Road Historic District, Springwood Manor, Wheeler Home, Holub Home, Friend Humphrey House, and Whitney Mansion are listed on the National Register of Historic Places.

Notable people
Roger McNamee, venture capital and private equity investor, founder of Elevation Partners and Silver Lake Partners, grew up in Loudonville.
Henry Reed Rathbone, present at Lincoln's assassination, lived on Cherry Tree Rd.
Joan Vollmer, beatnik and common law wife of William S. Burroughs.
James H. Fallon, American neuroscientist and author.
The Right Rt. David S. Ball, Former bishop of the Episcopalian Diocese of Albany

See also
Watervliet (town), New York

References

External links
 Town of Colonie
 

 
Colonie, New York
Hamlets in New York (state)
Former census-designated places in New York (state)
Hamlets in Albany County, New York